Verdugo Park is a large regional park in the southeastern Verdugo Mountains, within Glendale in Los Angeles County, California.

It is located at Cañada Boulevard near Verdugo Road and Glendale Community College.

Amenities
Ballfield, 
Basketball Court, 
Children's Play Area, 
Horseshoe Court, 
Picnic Areas, 
Skate Park,
Special Facilities.

References

External links
 Glendale City Parks: Verdugo Park website - in North Glendale
 Verdugo Park: Description

Parks in Los Angeles County, California
Glendale, California
Verdugo Mountains
Tourist attractions in Glendale, California